The Roman Catholic Diocese of Manado is a Latin rite suffragan diocese in the Ecclesiastical province of the Metropolitan Archdiocese of Makassar on Sulawesi island (formerly Celebes) in Indonesia, yet depends on the missionary Roman Congregation for the Evangelization of Peoples.
 
The cathedral episcopal see, the Cathedral Church of the Immaculate Heart of Mary (Gereja Hati Tersuci Maria),  located in the city of Manado, Sulawesi Utara, with its European architectural styles, unique bell towers, and topped with a beautiful central cupola, is located on the iconic Sam Ratulangi Street.

Statistics and extent 
As per 2015, it pastorally served 256,549 Catholics (4.0% of 6,630,180 total) on 90,000 km² in 67 parishes and 240 missions with 134 priests (90 diocesan, 34 religious), 366 lay religious (146 brothers, 220 sisters) and 98 seminarians.

Its service area covers the entire administrative provinces of North Sulawesi, Gorontalo and Central Sulawesi.

History 
 Established on 19 November 1919 as the Apostolic Prefecture of Celebes, on territory split off from the Apostolic Vicariate of Batavia
 1 February 1934: Promoted as the Apostolic Vicariate of Celebes
 13 April 1937: Renamed as Apostolic Vicariate of Manado, having lost territory to establish the then Apostolic Prefecture of Makassar (its future Metropolitan)
 Promoted on 3 January 1961 as Diocese of Manado, as suffragan of the Metropolitan Archdiocese of Makassar

Ordinaries 
(all Roman rite, so far members of a missionary Latin congregation)

Apostolic Prefects of Celebes  
 Father Gerardo Vesters, Sacred Heart Missionaries (M.S.C.) (born Netherlands) (12 December 1919 – 16 February 1923), later Titular Bishop of Diocletianopolis in Palæstina (16 February 1923 – death 30 August 1954) as Apostolic Vicar of Rabaul (Papua New Guinea) (16 February 1923 – retired 1938)
 Joannes Walter Panis, M.S.C. (born Netherlands) (12 June 1923 – 1 February 1934 see below)

Apostolic Vicar of Celebes  
 Joannes Walter Panis, M.S.C. (see above 1 February 1934 – 13 April 1937 see below), Titular Bishop of Trisipa (1 February 1934 – death 23 June 1952)

Apostolic Vicars of Manado  
 Joannes Walter Panis, M.S.C. (see above 13 April 1937 – retired 1946)
 Nicolas Verhoeven, M.S.C. (born Netherlands) (13 March 1947 – 3 January 1961 see below), Titular Bishop of Hermonthis (13 March 1947 – 3 January 1961)

Suffragan Bishops of Manado 
 Nicolas Verhoeven, M.S.C. (see above 3 January 1961 – retired 26 June 1969), emeriate as Titular Bishop of Strongoli (26 June 1969 – resigned 15 September 1976), died 1981
 Theodorus Hubertus Moors, M.S.C. (born Netherlands) (26 June 1969 – retired 8 February 1990), died 2003; succeeded as former Titular Bishop of Choba (13 April 1967 – 26 June 1969) and Auxiliary Bishop of Manado (13 April 1967 – 26 June 1969)
 Joseph Theodorus Suwatan, M.S.C. (first native incumbent) (8 February 1990 – retired 12 April 2017), also President of Episcopal Conference of Indonesia (1997 – 2000)
 Bishop Benedictus Estephanus Rolly Untu, M.S.C. (8 July 2017 – ...), no previous prelature

See also 
 List of Catholic dioceses in Indonesia

References

Sources and external links 
 GCatholic.org - data for all sections
 Catholic Hierarchy

Manado
Roman Catholic dioceses in Indonesia
Religious organizations established in 1919